Hawa Bhaban (also rendered as Hawa Bhavan, Hawa Bhawan) is the political office of the chairperson of the Bangladesh Nationalist Party, and monitors party affairs on the chair's behalf. It was viewed as an "alternate power house" in Bangladesh when BNP was in power. It became controversial during the 2006–2008 Bangladeshi political crisis, when the party joint secretary was Tareq Rahman. Some of government officials had a regular contact with viya (Tareq) to manipulate administrative matters like promotion, posting, appointment etc. of different ministries and division as a parallel government was administered from Hawa Bhaban.

References

Bangladesh Nationalist Party
Houses in Bangladesh